This article contains a list of current SNCF railway stations in the Auvergne-Rhône-Alpes region of France, sorted by department.

Ain (01)

 Ambérieu
 Ambronay—Priay
 Bellegarde
 Bellignat
 Beynost
 Bourg-en-Bresse
 Brion—Montréal-la-Cluse
 Ceyzériat
 Cize—Bolozon
 Culoz
 Les Échets
 Marlieux—Châtillon
 Meximieux—Pérouges
 Mézériat
 Mionnay
 Miribel
 Montluel
 Nurieux
 Oyonnax
 Polliat
 Pont-d'Ain
 Pont-de-Veyle
 Pougny—Chancy
 Saint-André-de-Courcy
 Saint-Marcel-en-Dombes
 Saint-Martin-du-Mont
 Saint-Maurice-de-Beynost
 Saint-Paul-de-Varax
 Saint-Rambert-en-Bugey
 Servas-Lent
 Seyssel-Corbonod
 Simandre-sur-Suran
 Tenay-Hauteville
 La Valbonne
 Villars-les-Dombes
 Villereversure
 Virieu-le-Grand-Belley
 Vonnas

Allier (03)

 Bellenaves
 Bessay
 Commentry
 Dompierre-Sept-Fons
 Gannat
 Huriel
 Louroux-de-Bouble
 Magnette
 Montluçon-Rimard
 Montluçon-Ville
 Moulins-sur-Allier
 Saint-Bonnet-de-Rochefort
 Saint-Germain-des-Fossés
 Les Trillers
 Urçay
 Vallon
 Varennes-sur-Allier
 Vichy
 La Ville-Gozet
 Villeneuve-sur-Allier

Ardèche (07)

No passenger stations

Cantal (15)

 Aurillac
 Boisset
 Lacapelle-Viescamp
 Laroquebrou
 Le Lioran
 Massiac
 Maurs
 Murat
 Neussargues
 Pers
 Saint-Flour-Chaudes-Aigues
 Vic-sur-Cère
 Viescamp-sous-Jallès
 Ytrac

Drôme (26)

 Crest
 Die
 Donzère
 Livron
 Loriol
 Luc-en-Diois
 Lus-la-Croix-Haute
 Montélimar
 Pierrelatte
 Romans-Bourg-de-Péage
 Saillans
 Saint-Rambert-d'Albon
 Saint-Vallier-sur-Rhône
 Tain-Hermitage-Tournon
 Valence TGV
 Valence-Ville

Isère (38)

 Les Abrets-Fitilieu
 Beaucroissant
 Bourgoin-Jallieu
 Brignoud
 Cessieu
 Châbons
 Chasse-sur-Rhône
 Clelles-Mens
 Echirolles
 Estressin
 Goncelin
 Le Grand-Lemps
 Grenoble
 Grenoble-Universités-Gières
 L'Isle-d'Abeau
 Jarrie-Vizille
 Lancey
 Moirans
 Moirans-Galifette
 Monestier-de-Clermont
 Le Péage-de-Roussillon
 Poliénas
 Pontcharra-sur-Breda
 Pont-de-Beauvoisin
 Pont-de-Claix
 Réaumont-Saint-Cassien
 Rives
 Saint-André-le-Gaz
 Saint-Clair-Les Roches
 Saint-Égrève-Saint-Robert
 Saint-Georges-de-Commiers
 Saint-Hilaire-Saint-Nazaire
 Saint-Marcellin
 Saint-Quentin-Fallavier
 La Tour-du-Pin
 Tullins-Fures
 La Verpillière
 Vienne
 Vif
 Vinay
 Virieu-sur-Bourbre
 Voiron
 Voreppe

Loire (42)

 Andrézieux
 Balbigny
 Boën
 Bonson
 Bouthéon
 Le Chambon-Feugerolles
 Le Coteau
 Feurs
 Firminy
 La Fouillouse
 Fraisse-Unieux
 Montbrison
 Montrond-les-Bains
 Noirétable
 Régny
 La Ricamarie
 Rive-de-Gier
 Roanne
 Saint-Chamond
 Saint-Étienne-Bellevue
 Saint-Étienne-Carnot
 Saint-Étienne-Châteaucreux
 Saint-Étienne-La Terrasse
 Saint-Étienne-Le Clapier
 Saint-Galmier-Veauche
 Saint-Jodard
 Saint-Romain-le-Puy
 Saint-Victor-Thizy
 Sury-le-Comtal

Haute-Loire (43)

 Alleyras
 Arvant
 Aurec
 Bas-Monistrol
 Brioude
 Chamalières
 Darsac
 Lachaud-Curmilhac
 Langeac
 Lavoûte-sur-Loire
 Monistriol-d'Allier
 Paulhaguet
 Pont-de-Lignon
 Le Puy-en-Velay
 Retournac
 Saint-Georges-d'Aurac
 Saint-Vincent-le-Château
 Vorey

Lyon Metropolis (69)

 Alaï
 Albigny–Neuville
 Casino-Lacroix-Laval
 Charbonnières-les-Bains
 Collonges-Fontaines
 Couzon-au-Mont-d'or
 Crépieux-la-Pape
 Dardilly-le-Jubin
 Dardilly-les-Mouilles
 Écully-la-Demi-Lune
 Feyzin
 Les Flachères
 Francheville
 Givors-Canal
 Givors-Ville
 Grigny-le-Sablon
 Irigny-Yvours
 Lyon-Gorge-de-Loup
 Lyon-Jean Macé
 Lyon-Part-Dieu
 Lyon-Perrache
 Lyon-Saint-Paul
 Lyon-Vaise
 Le Méridien
 Oullins
 Pierre-Bénite
 Quincieux
 Saint-Fons
 Saint-Germain-au-Mont-d'Or
 Saint-Priest
 Sathonay-Rillieux
 Tassin
 La Tour-de-Salvagny
 Vénissieux
 Vernaison

Puy-de-Dôme (63)

 Aigueperse
 Aubiat
 Aulnat-Aéroport
 La Bourboule
 Brassac-les-Mines-Sainte-Florine
 Le Breuil-sur-Couze
 Le Cendre-Orcet
 Clermont-Ferrand
 Clermont-La Pardieu
 Clermont-La Rotonde
 Durtol-Nohanent
 Gerzat
 Issoire
 Lapeyrouse
 Laqueuille
 Lezoux
 Les Martres-de-Veyre
 La Miouze-Rochefort
 Le Mont-Dore
 Parent-Coudes-Champeix
 Pont-de-Dore
 Pont-du-Château
 Pontgibaud
 Pontmort
 Riom-Châtel-Guyon
 Royat-Chamalières
 Sarliève-Cournon
 Thiers
 Le Vauriat
 Vertaizon
 Vic-le-Comte
 Volvic

Rhône (69)

 Amplepuis
 Anse
 L'Arbresle
 Belleville-sur-Saône
 Bois-d'Oingt-Legny
 Brignais
 Chamelet
 Chaponost
 Châtillon-d'Azergues
 Chazay-Marcilly
 Chessy
 Civrieux-d'Azergues
 Dommartin-Lissieu
 Fleurieux-sur-l'Arbresle
 Lamure-sur-Azergues
 Lentilly
 Lentilly-Charpenay
 Lozanne
 Lyon-Saint-Exupéry TGV
 Pontcharra-Saint-Forgeux
 Sain-Bel
 Saint-Georges-de-Reneins
 Saint-Romain-de-Popey
 Sérézin
 Tarare
 Villefranche-sur-Saône

Savoie (73)

 Aiguebelette-le-Lac
 Aiguebelle
 Aime-La Plagne
 Aix-les-Bains-Le Revard
 Albens
 Albertville
 Bourg-Saint-Maurice
 Chambéry-Challes-les-Eaux
 Chamousset
 Chindrieux
 Épierre-Saint-Léger
 Frontenex
 Grésy-sur-Aix
 Grésy-sur-Isère
 Landry
 Lépin-le-Lac-La Bauche
 Modane
 Montmélian
 Moûtiers-Salins-Brides-les-Bains
 Notre-Dame-de-Briançon
 Saint-Avre-la-Chambre
 Saint-Béron-la-Bridoire
 Saint-Jean-de-Maurienne
 Saint-Michel-Valloire
 Saint-Pierre-d'Albigny
 Vions-Chanaz
 Viviers-du-Lac

Haute-Savoie (74)

 Annecy
 Annemasse
 Argentière
 Bonneville
 Bons-en-Chablais
 Les Bossons
 Le Buet
 Chamonix-Aiguille-du-Midi
 Chamonix-Mont-Blanc
 Chedde
 Cluses
 Évian-les-Bains
 Groisy-Thorens-la-Caille
 Les Houches
 La Joux
 Machilly
 Magland
 Marignier
 Montroc-le-Planet
 Les Moussoux
 Les Pélerins
 Les Praz-de-Chamonix
 Perrignier
 Pringy
 Reignier
 La Roche-sur-Foron
 Rumilly
 Saint-Gervais-les-Bains-Le Fayet
 Saint-Julien-en-Genevois
 Saint-Martin-Bellevue
 Saint-Pierre-en-Faucigny
 Sallanches-Combloux-Megève
 Servoz
 Taconnaz
 Thonon-les-Bains
 Les Tines
 Valleiry
 Vallorcine
 Vaudagne
 Viaduc-Sainte-Marie

See also
 SNCF 
 List of SNCF stations for SNCF stations in other regions
 TER Auvergne-Rhône-Alpes

Auvergne-Rhone-Alpes